Andrés Crespo (born 5 April 1968) is a Spanish fencer. He competed in the team foil event at the 1992 Summer Olympics.

References

External links
 

1968 births
Living people
Spanish male foil fencers
Olympic fencers of Spain
Fencers at the 1992 Summer Olympics
Sportspeople from Burgos